The European Tour Qualifying School is an annual golf tournament which enables professional golfers to gain a place on the European Tour and its official development tour, the Challenge Tour.

The European Tour Qualifying School is held in three stages, with the final stage being played over six rounds at Infinitum Golf in Spain. The top 25 players win their card on the European Tour, and those finishing outside the top 25 gain a place on the Challenge Tour, with those making the cut being ranked in a higher exemption category.

Winners

References

External links
Coverage on the European Tour's official site

European Tour events
Challenge Tour events
Golf tournaments in Spain

nl:Qualifying School (golf)